Biturix rectilinea is a moth of the family Erebidae. It was described by Hermann Burmeister in 1878. It is found in Brazil, Argentina and Bolivia.

References

Phaegopterina
Moths described in 1878